Axius is a genus of mud lobster,

Species 
It containing the following species:
Axius armatus S. I. Smith, 1881
Axius serratus Stimpson, 1852
Axius stirynchus Leach, 1815
Axius werribee (Poore & Griffin, 1979)

References

Thalassinidea